The Porter Elliott Bridge, also known as Goose River Bridge, near Hillsboro, North Dakota is a Warren through truss structure that was built in 1902 over the Goose River.  It was previously listed on the National Register of Historic Places, but was removed in 2009.

References

Road bridges on the National Register of Historic Places in North Dakota
Bridges completed in 1902
Transportation in Traill County, North Dakota
National Register of Historic Places in Traill County, North Dakota
Warren truss bridges in the United States
1902 establishments in North Dakota
Former National Register of Historic Places in North Dakota
Bridges over the Goose River (North Dakota)